Bugoloobi Wastewater Treatment Plant (BWTP), also Bugoloobi Sewerage Treatment Plant (BSTP), is a wastewater treatment project in Uganda. It is the largest wastewater treatment plant in the countries of the East African Community, and capable of processing  of wastewater daily.

Location
The water treatment facility was constructed in the neighborhood of Bugoloobi, in Nakawa Division, in the south-eastern section of Kampala, the capital and largest city of Uganda. The geographical coordinates of the plant are 0°19'06.0"N, 32°36'27.0"E (Latitude:0.318333; Longitude:32.607500).

Overview
The Bugoloobi WTP, collects wastewater and sewerage from parts of the city, including Old Kampala, Mengo, Katwe, Nsambya, Kibuli, Mbuya, Nakawa, Naguru, Bukoto and Kamwookya. The new expanded STP is aimed at increasing and improving sanitation services in the city and reducing the pollution of the Nakivubo Channel, a surface-water effluent into Lake Victoria, thereby increasing the lake's environmental sustainability.

New areas to be added to the sewerage network include Bugoloobi, Kyambogo, Kasokoso, Kinnawattaka, Banda,  Butabika and neighbouring areas.

The bio-digesters in this plant, are expected to generate gases, which will be heated to generate  of electricity, to be used internally in the plant.  In addition, the solid wastes removed from the wastewater, are expected to be dried and sold as fertilizer, or as raw material for the manufacture of cooking briquettes.

Ownership
The water treatment facility is wholly owned by the National Water and Sewerage Corporation (NWSC), a government parastatal company, responsible for provision of potable water and sewerage services nationwide.

Construction
Construction began in May 2014, and concluded in 2021. NWSC plans to construct new sewerage treatment plants in Nalukolongo, between Ndeeba and Nateete, along the Kampala–Masaka Road and in Kajjansi, in addition the one in Lubigi, completed in 2014.

Financing
This project has received funding from (a) the government of Uganda, (b) the African Development Bank (c) the European Union and (d) KfW.

See also
 Ministry of Water and Environment (Uganda)

References

External links
 Website of National Water & Sewerage Corporation
 Website of Ministry of Water and Environment (Uganda)
 NWSC to increase water supply by 50% As of  5 August 2015.

Buildings and structures in Uganda
Nakawa Division
Central Region, Uganda
Water resources management